Abd El Gilil is a town in the Giza Governorate, Egypt. The distance between Abd El Gilil and Giza is approximately 69 km, the capital of the Giza Governorate, and 75 km between Abd El Gilil and Cairo.

References

Populated places in Giza Governorate